The Martin Marietta Corporation was an American company founded in 1961 through the merger of Glenn L. Martin Company and American-Marietta Corporation.  In 1995, it merged with Lockheed Corporation to form Lockheed Martin.

History
Martin Marietta formed in 1961 by the merger of the Glenn L. Martin Company and American-Marietta Corporation.

Martin, based in Baltimore, was primarily an aerospace concern with a recent focus on missiles, namely its Titan program. American-Marietta was headquartered in Chicago and produced paints, dyes, metallurgical products, construction materials, and other goods.

In 1982, Martin Marietta was subject to a hostile takeover bid by the Bendix Corporation, headed by William Agee. Bendix bought the majority of Martin Marietta shares and in effect owned the company. However, Martin Marietta's management used the short time separating ownership and control to sell non-core businesses and launch its own hostile takeover of Bendix (known as the Pac-Man defense). Thomas G. Pownall, CEO of Martin Marietta, was successful and the end of this extraordinarily bitter battle saw Martin Marietta survive; Bendix was bought by Allied Corporation.

Timeline

1961: Martin Marietta formed by merger of the Glenn L. Martin Company and American-Marietta Corporation
1963: Martin Marietta starts building floating nuclear power plant MH-1A as part of the Army Nuclear Power Program
1969: Martin Marietta commissioned to build the Mark IV monorail used on the Walt Disney World Monorail System between 1971-1989
1971: Martin Marietta loses landmark sex discrimination suit before the Supreme Court, in Phillips v. Martin Marietta Corp.
1975: Acquires Hoskyns Group (UK IT services company)
1982: Bendix Corporation's attempted takeover ends in its own sale to Allied Corporation; Martin Marietta survives
1986: Wins contract to convert Titan II ICBMs into space launch vehicles. The Martin Company built the original ICBMs
1987: Electronics & Missiles Group formed, headquartered in Orlando
1991: Electronics & Missiles Group reorganized into the Electronics, Information & Missiles Group
1993: Acquires GE Aerospace for 3 billion USD, allowing combined marketing of complementary systems, e.g. Martin Marietta's Titan missiles launching GE Aerospace's satellites
1993: Acquires management contract for Sandia National Laboratories
1993: Acquires General Dynamics' Space Systems Division, maker of the Atlas family of launch vehicles
1994: Martin Marietta completed its initial public offering of 19% of the common stock of Martin Marietta Materials, which is listed on the New York Stock Exchange as MLM
1995: Martin Marietta merged with Lockheed Corporation to form Lockheed Martin
1996: Lockheed Martin splits off Martin Marietta Materials as a separate and independent entity

Products

Aircraft
Martin X-23 PRIME
Martin Marietta X-24A
Martin Marietta X-24B

Missiles and rockets
AGM-12 Bullpup
AGM-62 Walleye
Titan (rocket family)
HGM-25A Titan I
LGM-25C Titan II
Titan IIIA
Titan IIIB
Titan IIIC
Commercial Titan III
Titan IIID
Titan IIIE
Titan IV
Titan 23G
Titan 34D
M712 Copperhead
MGM-31 Pershing
Pershing II
MGM-51 Shillelagh
MGM-118 Peacekeeper
MGM-134 Midgetman
FGM-148 Javelin
AGR-14 ZAP
ASALM
Sprint (missile)
Atlas (rocket family)
Atlas I
Atlas II

Spacecraft
Magellan (spacecraft)
Mars Polar Lander
Viking program
Viking 1
Viking 2
WIND (spacecraft)

Unmanned aerial vehicles
Martin Marietta Model 845
AQM-127 SLAT

Significant components of vehicles
Space Shuttle external tank

See also

 List of monorail systems

References

1961 establishments in Maryland
1995 disestablishments in Maryland
Aerospace companies of the United States
Aviation in Maryland
Defense companies of the United States
Defunct aircraft manufacturers of the United States
Electronics companies established in 1961
Electronics companies of the United States
 
Manufacturing companies based in Maryland
Manufacturing companies established in 1961
Manufacturing companies disestablished in 1995
1995 mergers and acquisitions
Superfund sites in Oregon